Betty Faire was a British actress of the silent era.

Selected filmography
 The Door That Has No Key (1921)
 Bentley's Conscience (1922)
 The Lonely Lady of Grosvenor Square (1922)
 The Loves of Mary, Queen of Scots (1923)
 Claude Duval (1924)
 The Gay Corinthian (1924)
 The Conspirators (1924)
 A Romance of Mayfair (1925)
 The Presumption of Stanley Hay, MP (1925)
 Bulldog Drummond's Third Round (1925)
 The Only Way (1927)
 The City of Youth (1928)
 The Man Who Changed His Name (1928)
 Cross Roads (1930)

References

External links

Year of birth unknown
Year of death unknown
British film actresses
English film actresses
English silent film actresses
English stage actresses
20th-century English actresses